Sées Cathedral is a Roman Catholic church and national monument of France in Sées (formerly also Séez) in Normandy. It is the seat of the Bishop of Séez.

The cathedral was declared a basilica minor on 7 March 1871.

The Gothic cathedral dates from the 13th and 14th century and occupies the site of three earlier churches. The west front, which is disfigured by the buttresses projecting beyond it, has two stately spires of open work 230 ft. high. The nave was built towards the end of the 13th century. The choir, built soon afterward, is remarkable for the lightness of its construction. In the choir are four bas-reliefs of great beauty representing scenes in the life of the Virgin Mary; and the altar is adorned with another depicting the removal of the relics of Saints Gervais and Protais. The church has constantly been the object of restoration and reconstruction.

The cathedral has a magnificent organ by Cavaille-Coll which has recently been restored.  Sunday afternoon recitals are held during July and August.  The choir organ is also by the same maker.

In 2015, during restoration work on the North Tower, three new bells were installed.

See also
List of Gothic Cathedrals in Europe

References

Sources

 
 Cathédrales-de-France: Sées
 Catholic Encyclopedia: Séez 

Roman Catholic cathedrals in France
Churches in Orne
Basilica churches in France